Waldo Miller Salt (October 18, 1914 – March 7, 1987) was an American screenwriter who won Academy Awards for both  Midnight Cowboy and Coming Home.

Early life and career
Salt was born in Chicago, Illinois, the son of Winifred (née Porter) and William Haslem Salt, an artist and business executive. He graduated from Stanford University in 1934. The first of the nineteen films he wrote or co-wrote was released in 1937 with the title The Bride Wore Red.

Salt's career in Hollywood was interrupted when he was blacklisted after refusing to testify before the House Committee on Un-American Activities in 1951.  Like many other blacklisted writers, while he was unable to work in Hollywood, Salt wrote under a pseudonym for the British television series The Adventures of Robin Hood. 

After the collapse of the blacklist, Salt won Academy Awards for Best Writing, Screenplay Based on Material from Another Medium for his work on Midnight Cowboy and Coming Home, as well as earning a nomination for Serpico.

Salt is featured in the extras for the Criterion Collection's Midnight Cowboy blu-ray release, specifically in an audio interview with Michael Childers; many photos of Waldo Salt can be seen here as he was a collaborator for the screenplay. The documentary listed below, Waldo Salt: A Screenwriter's Journey, is also featured on the disc.

Personal life and death

Salt was married four times, first to Amber Dana, then to actress Mary Davenport with whom he had two children, actress/writer/producer Jennifer, and Deborah. After his divorce from Davenport, he married Gladys Schwartz and later playwright Eve Merriam. He remained married to Merriam until his death in Los Angeles, aged 72, on March 7, 1987.

Documentary
Waldo Salt was the subject of a 1990 documentary Waldo Salt: A Screenwriter's Journey, which featured interviews with Dustin Hoffman, Robert Redford, Jon Voight, John Schlesinger and other collaborators and friends.

The Waldo Salt Screenwriting Award
The Waldo Salt Screenwriting Award, first presented in 1992, is awarded at the Sundance Film Festival annually. It is determined by the dramatic jury, and recognizes outstanding screenwriting in a film screened at the festival that year.

Filmography

Awards and nominations

References

External links
 
 Waldo Salt from the American Masters website
 Waldo Salt Papers, an inventory of papers kept in the UCLA Library
 

1914 births
1987 deaths
American communists
American male screenwriters
Best Adapted Screenplay Academy Award winners
Best Original Screenplay Academy Award winners
Best Screenplay BAFTA Award winners
Hollywood blacklist
Writers from Chicago
Stanford University alumni
Writers Guild of America Award winners
Screenwriters from Illinois
20th-century American male writers
20th-century American screenwriters